Arba is an unincorporated community in Greensfork Township, Randolph County, in the U.S. state of Indiana.

History
Arba was settled by Quakers as early as 1815. A post office was established at Arba in 1849, and remained in operation until it was discontinued in 1911.

Geography

References

Unincorporated communities in Randolph County, Indiana
Unincorporated communities in Indiana